The Seram masked owl (Tyto almae) is an owl species in the family Tytonidae endemic to Seram Island in Indonesia. After being first brought to the attention of the world from a photograph taken during an expedition by Rudi Badil and Sukianto Lusli in the Manusela National Park in Seram in 1987 the holotype was mist-netted on 10 February 2012 and this species was formally described in 2013. The species' epithet commemorates Alma Jønsson, the daughter of Knud Andreas Jønsson, one of the describers of the Seram masked owl.

Description
Measurements are only available for the holotype whose body length was 31 cm, and weighed 540 g. The upperparts including the most upperwing coverts are covered densely and irregularly with fuscous spots. The background is ochre-buff to orange-buff.

Status and conservation
Though no population data are available the Seram masked owl might be threatened by habitat loss. Therefore, the protection of the Manusela National Park is highly important for the long-term conservation of this species.

References

External links
Entry in the Oriental Bird Club Image Database

Seram masked owl
Birds of Seram
Endemic fauna of Seram Island
Seram masked owl